The Damn Vulnerable Web Application is a software project that intentionally includes security vulnerabilities and is intended for educational purposes.

Examples 
 Cross site scripting
 SQL injection

References

External links 
 

Free and open-source software
Hacking (computer security)